The Things That We Are Made Of is the fourteenth studio album by American singer-songwriter Mary Chapin Carpenter. It was released on May 6, 2016 by Lambent Light Records. The album was produced by Dave Cobb.

Background
Carpenter recorded The Things That We Are Made Of at Dave Cobb's Low Country Sound studio in Nashville, Tennessee; production was helmed by Cobb. She began writing the material for the album about four years prior, and described the writing process as similar to those of her previous works in an interview with Diane Rehm: "[W]henever I've started a record, I haven't really had, like, a topic or an agenda or anything to sort of stitch the songs together. They just kind of come out. And when I finished the writing for [The Things That We Are Made Of], I was able to sort of see it as one thing and it really was this sort of document of where I am in my life, what this age that I'm at is bringing to me, [and] what I have lost along the way." In another interview with HuffPost, Carpenter said that the album's songs "poses questions at every verse", further adding that "What I was trying to articulate is that duality, two sides of ourselves that want to be unanswerable but also want that deep connection and safety. How to reconcile those two things? The song "Something Tamed Something Wild" poses that question and those conversations run through the record."

Critical reception

Upon release, The Things We Are Made Of received mixed reviews from music critics. Benjamin Naddaff-Hafrey of NPR called the album "surprising", however he praised Dave Cobb's production for "stripping Carpenter's arrangements back" in contrast to her previous album Songs from the Movie (2014). He also wrote: "In the process, she makes you believe that the lucky end of the stories we tell ourselves is the ability to look through memories and find real acceptance — the things we're made of and the strength to set off again."

Track listing

Spotify, iTunes and Apple Music bonus tracks

Personnel
Credits for The Things That We Are Made Of adapted from AllMusic.

Musicians
 Mary Chapin Carpenter - vocals, acoustic guitar, electric guitar
 Dave Cobb - acoustic guitar, electric guitar, gut string guitar, mellotoron, moog, percussion, synthesizer
 Brian Allen - bass
 Annie Clements - bass
 Eamon McLoughlin - strings
 Chris Powell - drums, percussion
 Jimmy Walace - hammond B3, piano
 Mike Webb - fender rhodes, hammond B3, mellotron, piano, reed organ

Technical
 Dave Cobb - production, mixing
 Pete Lyman - mastering engineer
 Eamon McLoughlin - strings engineer
 Matt Ross-Spang - engineering, mixing
 Mike Stankiewicz - assistant engineering

Design
 Aaron Farrington - photography
 Kit Peltzel - artwork design
 Lisa Wright - artwork design

Chart performance

References

2016 albums
Mary Chapin Carpenter albums
Albums produced by Dave Cobb